Lukas Daniel Haas (born April 16, 1976) is an American actor and musician. His acting career has spanned four decades, during which he has appeared in more than 50 feature films and a number of television shows and stage productions.

Early life
Haas was born in West Hollywood, California, the son of Berthold Haas, an artist, and Emily Tracy, an author. His mother is from Texas, and his father emigrated from Germany. He has two brothers: twins Simon Jakoway Haas and Nikolai Johannes Haas, both designers.

Acting career
Haas was discovered at the age of five in his kindergarten by casting director Margery Simkin. His first screen role was as a child in the 1983 nuclear holocaust film Testament. He became more widely known in 1985 when, at the age of eight, he appeared in Witness. His performance as an Amish boy who is the sole witness to a police officer's murder was well received by critics. Haas followed this with roles in films such as Solarbabies (1986) and  Lady in White (1988). In 1989, he appeared in the film Music Box, as the 12-year-old son of Jessica Lange's character, and grandson of an immigrant who is accused of being a war criminal. For this role he was nominated for the Young Artist Award. He also starred in the films Alan and Naomi (1992) and Rambling Rose (1993).

Haas received an Emmy nomination for his portrayal of Ryan White in the television film The Ryan White Story (1989), about an American teenager who contracted AIDS through contaminated blood treatments for hemophilia. On stage in 1988, he performed in Samuel Beckett's Waiting for Godot at Lincoln Center in New York City. He went on to appear in Everyone Says I Love You, Mars Attacks!, and Breakfast of Champions. His work in the 2000s includes Brick, Last Days, and While She Was Out. Haas also gained recognition for his portrayal of The Patient in the music video for the My Chemical Romance song "Welcome to the Black Parade".

In March 2010, Haas was inducted into the Texas Film Hall of Fame. More recently he appeared in Red Riding Hood, Contraband and Christopher Nolan's Inception. He has made guest appearances in Amazing Stories, both the 1985 and the 2002 versions of The Twilight Zone, The Young Indiana Jones Chronicles, As Told by Ginger, The Zeta Project, 24, Criminal Minds, Dirt and Entourage. He had a role on the 2012 television series Touch. During 2014 he co-starred also in the horror film Dark Was the Night.

In 2018, Haas played astronaut Michael Collins, the Apollo 11 Command Module Pilot, in First Man, a film about the first human moon landing space flight in 1969. The film was directed by Damien Chazelle, with whom he reunited with in the 2022 film Babylon.

Music career
Haas is the drummer and pianist for The Rogues. He has composed parts of several film soundtracks, including Breakfast of Champions and Last Days, and performed as a guest musician on the Macy Gray album The Trouble with Being Myself and the Jet album Shaka Rock. In 2008, he released a solo EP. He appeared in the music videos for OutKast's "Roses," My Chemical Romance's "Welcome to the Black Parade," UGK's "International Player's Anthem (I Choose You)," Death Cab For Cutie's "Cath…," and Jet's "She's a Genius".

On February 25, 2011, the media announced that Haas had released a musical collaboration with Isabel Lucas called "Made for You". The recorded and video clip were filmed in Lukas' LA studio, and were later revealed to be a marketing campaign of the Portuguese band The Gift for their album Explode.

Filmography

Film

Television

Music videos
"Welcome to the Black Parade" (2006) by My Chemical Romance as the Patient
"Roses" (2006) by OutKast as the Dancing Student
"International Players Anthem (I Choose You)" (2007) by UGK as groomsman
"Cath..." (2008) by Death Cab for Cutie

References

Bibliography
 Holmstrom, John. The Moving Picture Boy: An International Encyclopaedia from 1895 to 1995, Norwich, Michael Russell, 1996, p. 398.

External links

 

1976 births
Male actors from California
American male child actors
American male film actors
American male television actors
American people of German descent
Living people
People from Greater Los Angeles
20th-century American male actors
21st-century American male actors